Gillsburg, also spelled as Gillsburgh, is an unincorporated community in Amite County, Mississippi, United States. The community is part of the McComb, Mississippi Micropolitan Statistical Area.

History
Gillsburg was the location of the October 20, 1977 plane crash that killed three members of the band Lynyrd Skynyrd. A rental plane carrying the band between shows from Greenville, South Carolina, to LSU in Baton Rouge, Louisiana, was low on fuel and crashed in a swamp in Gillsburg. The crash killed singer/songwriter Ronnie Van Zant, guitarist Steve Gaines, vocalist Cassie Gaines, assistant road manager Dean Kilpatrick, pilot Walter McCreary, and co-pilot William Gray. The other band members were seriously injured in the crash.

Gillsburg was home to the Wall family, one of the last black families to be held in peonage in the United States.

A post office operated under the name Gillsburgh from 1879 to 1892 and under the name Gillsburg from 1892 to 1915.

Notable persons
 Drury Wall, member of the Mississippi House of Representatives from 1916 to 1920
 Frank Wall, member of the Mississippi House of Representatives from 1952 to 1960

References

Unincorporated communities in Amite County, Mississippi
Unincorporated communities in Mississippi
McComb micropolitan area